Dhi As Sufal District is a district of the Ibb Governorate, Yemen. As of 2003, the district had a population of 163,019 inhabitants.

References

Districts of Ibb Governorate
Dhi As Sufal District